Hiram Gabriel (February 15, 1825 – February 5, 1918) was an American farmer and politician.

Born in Union County, Ohio, Gabriel moved to the town of York, Green County, Wisconsin Territory, in 1844, and settled in Stewart, Wisconsin. Gabriel was a farmer. Gabriel served in the 46th Wisconsin Volunteer Infantry Regiment during the American Civil War. Gabriel served as town assessor, town treasurer, and chairman of the York Town Board. In 1882 and 1883, Gabriel served in the Wisconsin State Assembly as a Republican. Gabriel died in Madison, Wisconsin.

Notes

1825 births
1918 deaths
People from Union County, Ohio
People from York, Green County, Wisconsin
People of Wisconsin in the American Civil War
Farmers from Wisconsin
Mayors of places in Wisconsin
19th-century American politicians
Republican Party members of the Wisconsin State Assembly